Leck is a civil parish in Lancaster, Lancashire, England. It contains 21 listed buildings that are recorded in the National Heritage List for England.  All of the listed buildings are designated at Grade II, the lowest of the three grades, which is applied to "buildings of national importance and special interest".  Other than the small settlement of Leck, the parish is rural.  The most substantial building in the parish is Leck Hall; this and associated buildings are listed.  Most of the other listed buildings are houses, farmhouses and associated structures.  Also listed are a church and stones of various types.

Buildings

References

Citations

Sources

Lists of listed buildings in Lancashire
Buildings and structures in the City of Lancaster